Galesburg Municipal Airport  is a city owned public use airport located three miles (5 km) west of the central business district of Galesburg, a city in Knox County, Illinois, United States.

Facilities and aircraft 

The airport has a fixed-base operator that offers fuel as well as cargo handling, catering, and GPUs as well as conference rooms, lounges, office space, snooze rooms, and courtesy cars.

For the 12-month period ending March 31, 2020, the airport had 14,000 aircraft operations, an average of 38 per day: 79% general aviation, 18% air taxi, and 3% military. For the same time period, there were 27 aircraft based at this airport: 22 single-engine and 3 multi-engine airplanes, 1 jet, and 1 helicopter.

Stearman Fly-In 
Annually, Galesburg Municipal Airport hosts the National Stearman Fly-In. The fly-in includes numerous World War II-era Boeing Stearman aircraft from around the world. Galesburg has been the host airport of the fly-in since 1972 and regularly sees more than 100 aircraft for the fly-in and related airshow. In 2022, there was a newly-built Stearman Community Center at the airport to help host the event. The event includes forums, aerobatics, and rides in Stearman aircraft as well as STOL competitions and flour-bombing.

References

External links 
Galesburg Municipal Airport at City of Galesburg website

Airports in Illinois
Galesburg, Illinois
Transportation buildings and structures in Knox County, Illinois
Former Essential Air Service airports